Louis Thauron (born 5 August 1995) is a French ice dancer. With his former partner Adelina Galyavieva, he is the 2021 French National Champion. With Angélique Abachkina, he represented France at four World Junior Championships, finishing within the top ten at three editions (2015–2017).

Personal life 
Louis Thauron was born on 5 August 1995 in Paris. As of 2016, he is studying engineering at INSA Lyon school. In 2019, Louis decided to enter in EM Lyon for a Master.

Career

Early years 
Thauron began skating in 2000. He competed internationally on the novice level with Lindsay Pousset during the 2010–11 season. The following season, they received assignments to two ISU Junior Grand Prix events, in Austria and Italy. They were coached by Christophe Lecomte and Benjamin Delmas in Viry-Châtillon.

Partnership with Abachkina 
Thauron teamed up with Angélique Abachkina in 2012. The duo debuted on the ISU Junior Grand Prix series in 2013, placing eighth in Estonia and tenth in Poland. In 2014, they were named in the French team for the World Junior Championships in Sofia, Bulgaria. Abachkina/Thauron placed 19th in the short dance, 15th in the free dance, and 18th overall. They were coached by Muriel Zazoui, Romain Haguenauer, Olivier Schoenfelder, and Diana Ribas in Lyon, France, during the 2013–14 season.

Abachkina/Thauron changed coaches prior to the 2014–15 season, joining Igor Shpilband and Fabian Bourzat in Novi, Michigan. They placed seventh at both of their 2014 JGP events. Ranked eighth in the short dance and seventh in the free, they finished eighth overall at the 2015 World Junior Championships in Tallinn, Estonia.

Competing in the 2015 JGP series, Abachkina/Thauron won the silver medal in Riga, Latvia, and placed fourth in Zagreb, Croatia. They finished 7th at the 2016 World Junior Championships in Debrecen, Hungary. In the 2016 JGP series, Abachkina/Thauron were awarded gold in Saint-Gervais-les-Bains, France, and bronze in Yokohama, Japan.

Partnership with Galyavieva 
Louis Thauron teamed up with French ice dancer Adelina Galyavieva after a tryout in Lyon on 14 February 2018.[2][5] The two decided to represent France but train in Moscow, coached by Russia's Anjelika Krylova and Oleg Volkov.[2] Making their debut, they placed 8th at the 2018 CS Ondrej Nepela Trophy in September.

As France's host pick, Galyavieva/Thauron competed at the 2018 Internationaux de France, placing 10th overall at the November Grand Prix event.[6][7] In December, they won their first international medal, bronze at Turkey's Bosphorus Cup, and then took bronze at the French Championships. They were subsequently named to France's team for the 2019 European Championships. Season 2018/2019 ends with a bronze medal at 29th Winter Universiade 2019 in Krasnoyarsk, with a total score 177,23 pts.

Programs 

(with Galyavieva)

(with Abachkina)

Competitive highlights 
GP: Grand Prix; CS: Challenger Series; JGP: Junior Grand Prix

With Galyavieva

With Abachkina

With Pousset

References

External links 
 
 
 
 

1995 births
French male ice dancers
Living people
Figure skaters from Paris
Universiade bronze medalists for France
Universiade medalists in figure skating
Competitors at the 2019 Winter Universiade
Emlyon Business School alumni